Purpose is the second studio album by South Korean singer Taeyeon. It was released through SM Entertainment on October 28, 2019. It features 12 tracks, including the Gaon number-one single "Four Seasons" and its B-side "Blue" alongside ten new tracks, including the title track "Spark". On January 15, 2020, a repackage edition of Purpose was released including three new songs, including title track "Dear Me". Musically, it is a pop record that contains influences of ballad, R&B, blues and jazz. The album was originally set to be released on October 22, 2019, but was postponed until October 28 due to the passing of Sulli.

Purpose was met with generally positive reviews from music critics and debuted at number two in South Korea, selling over 154,258 copies. The album received nominations for Disc Bonsang and Disc Daesang at the 34th Golden Disc Awards, while its single "Four Seasons" won Digital Bonsang, and was also nominated for Digital Daesang. Purpose appeared on numerous year-end best music lists of 2019.

Background
The album features songs in a "variety of styles". The title is said to represent "Taeyeon's goals as both a person and singer and show how music has become the greatest purpose and direction in [her] life".

Promotion
On October 14, 2019, Taeyeon released teaser photos for the album featuring a "red-lit aesthetic" of her face and shoulders, which was called "sultry" by Gulf News. SM originally set the release date of the album on October 22, 2019, but the promotional schedule was temporarily halted due to the death of Sulli. The first teaser of the music video for the title track 'Spark' was released on the official SM Entertainment YouTube channel on October 23, while the second teaser of the music video was released on October 25, 2019. The music video of 'Spark' was released on October 28, 2019, which was released simultaneously with the release of the album.

Taeyeon did not appear on any music shows and or engage in any promotion for Purpose (except for fansign events) as she decided to pay respects to her late friend Sulli, and also to take care of her mental health. On January 13, 2020, a teaser of the music video for the title track "Dear Me" was released on the official SM Entertainment YouTube channel, while the music video was released on January 15, 2020, which was released simultaneously with the release of the Purpose repackage.

Composition
The digital edition of Purpose contains ten songs, while the physical release includes twelve tracks including the Gaon number-one single "Four Seasons" and its B-side "Blue", which was released as a digital single on March 24, 2019. There are three versions of the physical edition – two regular versions with the same dust cover and either a red or white hard cover book and 1 deluxe edition with a different cover, booklet and packaging style.

The album incorporates various genres that are "based on Taeyeon's unique vocals". The title track "Spark" was revealed to be an alternative soul pop song. Meanwhile, "Here I Am" is a melancholy ballad song, which creates a powerful vocal performance from Taeyeon,  along with "Gravity", another pop ballad track in the album. "Find Me" takes inspiration from rock and blues with its simple modern piano and drums to lead the melody and "City Love" is an emotional R&B retro song that combines city pop sounds with a soft guitar. "Do You Love Me" is a jazz-based ballad song that combines musical instruments and vintage string sounds reminiscent of a jazz club, while "Better Babe" is a blues-rock track that expresses the sadness of parting with Taeyeon's soulful voice. "Love You Like Crazy" was described as an alternative rock and soul-influenced song, "LOL" is an alternative R&B based electropop and "Wine" is a sentimental R&B pop genre song.

Three new songs added to the reissue album are "Dear Me", "My Tragedy" and "Drawing Our Moments". "Dear Me" is an emotional ballad song with the harmony of an acoustic and string melody, while  "My Tragedy" is a trip hop, which starts with the sound of a reed organ and leads to an orchestral arrangement, and "Drawing Our Moments" is a ballad song that makes delicate performances of acoustic folk guitars with a pretty flute-like instrument and a piano carrying the song alongside Taeyeon's voice.

Critical reception

Purpose received generally positive reviews from media outlets. Chester Chin from The Star lauded the album's musical styles with "the artistic confidence on Purpose feels intensely liberating, and it is one heck of a confident record – in soul, sentiment and sound" and "On Purpose, the Girls' Generation alumni delivers a larger-than-life performance on a deliciously darker and much more musically complex record". He additionally complimented on Taeyeon's vocals and labelled Purpose as "artistic clarity" follow-up to her previous studio album My Voice. Idology Korea ranked it the eighth best K-pop album of 2019.

Accolades

Commercial performance
Within just a few hours of its release, "Purpose" took over iTunes charts in 22 regions. She had set a record taking over the number one spot on iTunes charts in most countries for a Korean female soloist. She broke her own record by landing on the top spot in 26 countries with Repackaged version, after being surpassed by Wendy's Like Water. The repackaged album also rose to the top of China's largest music site QQ Music, KuGou Music, and Kuwo Music's album sales chart.

In South Korea, Purpose debuted at number two on the Gaon Album Chart with 154,258 copies sold. The album became Taeyeon's sixth top ten album in the country, and broke the record for the largest first day sales for a female artist with 78,327 copies on Hanteo being hit days later by IU's Love Poem.

In Japan, the album debuted at number twenty-five on the Oricon Albums Chart and has sold over 3,000 copies as of October 2019. Purpose debuted at number nine the Billboard World Albums, becoming Taeyeon's fifth top 10 entry on the chart. It additionally charted at number 14 on the Top Heatseekers.

Track listing
Credits adapted from Naver

Charts

Weekly charts

Monthly charts

Year-end charts

Sales

Release history

Notes

References

2019 albums
Taeyeon albums
Korean-language albums
SM Entertainment albums
Pop albums by South Korean artists
Rhythm and blues albums by South Korean artists